SD Salmoor (previously  RMAS Salmoor (A185)) was a Sal-Class mooring and salvage vessel working at HMNB Clyde, and based at Great Harbour, Greenock. She was originally operated by the Royal Maritime Auxiliary Service, but after the organisations disbandment in March 2008 she was operated by Serco Marine Services.

Salmoor was built by Hall, Russell & Company in 1985. She had a displacement is 2,200 tonnes and dimensions 77 m by 15 m by 4 m. Her complement was 19 and speed .

Her duties included the laying and maintenance of underwater targets, navigation marks and moorings.

See also
Naval Service (United Kingdom)
List of ships of Serco Marine Services

References

Royal Maritime Auxiliary Service
Serco Marine Services (ships)
1985 ships
Ships built by Hall, Russell & Company